Hotel Blessing is a historic hotel located in Blessing, Texas, United States. The hotel was designed by Jules Leffland of Victoria. The hotel has been a community gathering place since it opened in 1907 The building was added to the National Register of Historic Places on February 1, 1979.

Hotel Blessing was built by Jonathan Edwards Pierce, Blessing's founder. It was designed in an unusual expression of the Mission Revival style using an entirely wood facade instead of adobe or plaster over brick.

Pierce built the hotel to provide lodging for land seekers settling the region and traveling salesmen. The hotel was refinished and painted in the 1930s. During World War II, wives and girlfriends of soldiers at Camp Hulen in Palacios would frequent the inn. Since World War II, the camp closed and freight train service stopped. The hotel stopped renting rooms in 1972.

In 1977, Able Pierce, Jonathan Pierce's grandson, and his wife Ruth renovated and reopened the hotel. The hotel was deeded to the Blessing Historical Society, which currently operates the hotel. The hotel has 25 rooms, most which have a semiprivate bathroom or share a bathroom in a hall. The hotel also has a popular coffee shop, where locals gather to discuss community events.

See also

National Register of Historic Places listings in Matagorda County, Texas
Recorded Texas Historic Landmarks in Matagorda County

References

External links

"The Hotel Blessing Coffee Shop" TexasBob.com

Hotels in Texas
Hotel Blessing
Hotel Blessing
Hotels established in 1907
Hotel buildings completed in 1907
Mission Revival architecture in Texas
National Register of Historic Places in Matagorda County, Texas
Recorded Texas Historic Landmarks
1907 establishments in Texas